Rata is a genus of crabs in the family Xanthidae, containing the following species:

 Rata chalcal Davie, 1997
 Rata tuamotense Davie, 1992

References

Xanthoidea